Steven Murray (born 1 December 1967) is a Scottish former professional footballer who played as a midfielder in the Football League for York City, and was on the books of Nottingham Forest and Celtic without making a league appearance. He was capped by the Scotland national under-19 team. His career was ended following a severe leg injury received playing for Celtic reserves and subsequently he received a six figure court settlement.

References

1967 births
Living people
Footballers from Kilmarnock
Scottish footballers
Scotland youth international footballers
Association football midfielders
Nottingham Forest F.C. players
York City F.C. players
Celtic F.C. players
English Football League players